is a passenger railway station located in the city of Shiraoka, Saitama, Japan, operated by East Japan Railway Company (JR East).

Lines

Station layout
This station has an elevated station building with two opposed ground-level side platforms underneath, serving three tracks. The station is staffed.

Platforms

History
Shin-Shiraoka Station opened on 26 February 1987. With the privatization of Japanese National Railways (JNR) on 1 April 1987, the station came under the control of JR East.

Passenger statistics
In fiscal 2019, the station was used by an average of 6,954 passengers daily (boarding passengers only).

Surrounding area
Shiraoka New Town

See also
 List of railway stations in Japan

References

External links

 JR East station information 

Railway stations in Saitama Prefecture
Railway stations in Japan opened in 1987
Tōhoku Main Line
Utsunomiya Line
Shiraoka, Saitama